Zürcher Symphoniker (Zurich Symphony Orchestra) is a symphony orchestra made of up 72 professional freelance musicians, based in Zurich, Switzerland. It was founded in 1981 by music director, Daniel Schweizer.  performs approximately  thirty-five concerts per year, with the Tonhalle as its resident concert hall. Among the soloist the orchestra has performed with are Brigitte Farner, Michiko Tsuda, Nina Karmon, Lynnette Seah, Ulrich Meldau, Raffael Gintoli, Oswaldo Souza and Michael Erni. The orchestra has toured Singapore, Germany, Italy, China and Spain.

External links
https://www.zuercher-symphoniker.com

Swiss orchestras
Musical groups established in 1981
1981 establishments in Switzerland
Culture of Zürich